Francesco Perez was an 18th-century Italian abbot and mathematician, whose work Tri-lichanon goni-arith-metron, describing a goniometer (instrument for measurement of angles), was published in 1781. He later published a letter complaining about the "plagiarizing usurpation" of this invention by Eliseo della Concezione.

Works

References 

18th-century births
18th-century Italian mathematicians
18th-century Italian Roman Catholic priests